Dompierre railway station is a railway station in the village of Dompierre, within the municipality of Belmont-Broye, in the Swiss canton of Fribourg. It is an intermediate stop on the standard gauge Palézieux–Lyss line of Swiss Federal Railways.

Services 
The following services stop at Dompierre:

References

External links 
 
 

Railway stations in the canton of Fribourg
Swiss Federal Railways stations